In North America, a standpipe is a type of rigid water piping which is built into multi-story buildings in a vertical position, or into bridges in a horizontal position, to which fire hoses can be connected, allowing manual application of water to the fire. Within the context of a building or bridge, a standpipe serves the same purpose as a fire hydrant.

In many other countries, hydrants in streets are below ground level. Fire trucks carry standpipes and key, and there are bars on the truck. The bar is used to lift a cover in the road, exposing the hydrant. The standpipe is then "sunk" into the hydrant, and the hose is connected to the exposed ends of the standpipe. The bar is then combined with the key, and is used to turn the hydrant on and off.

Dry standpipe

When standpipes are fixed into buildings, the pipe is in place permanently with an intake usually located near a road or driveway, so that a fire engine can supply water to the system. The standpipe extends into the building to supply fire fighting water to the interior of the structure via hose outlets, often located between each pair of floors in stairwells in high rise buildings. Dry standpipes are not filled with water until needed in fire fighting. Fire fighters often bring hoses in with them and attach them to standpipe outlets located along the pipe throughout the structure. This type of standpipe may also be installed horizontally on bridges.

Wet standpipe
A "wet" standpipe is filled with water and is pressurized at all times. In contrast to dry standpipes, which can be used only by firefighters, wet standpipes can be used by building occupants. Wet standpipes generally already come with hoses so that building occupants may fight fires quickly. This type of standpipe may also be installed horizontally on bridges.

Advantages
Laying a firehose up a stairwell takes time, and this time is saved by having fixed hose outlets already in place. There is also a tendency for heavy wet hoses to slide downward when placed on an incline (such as the incline seen in a stairwell), whereas standpipes do not move. The use of standpipes keeps stairwells clear and is safer for exiting occupants.

Standpipes go in a direct up and down direction rather than looping around the stairwell, greatly reducing the length and thus the loss of water pressure due to friction loss.  Additionally, standpipes are rigid and do not kink, which can occur when a firehose is improperly laid on a stairwell.

Standpipe systems also provide a level of redundancy, should the main water distribution system within a building fail or be otherwise compromised by a fire or explosion.

Disadvantages

Standpipes are not fail-safe systems and there have been many instances where fire operations have been compromised by standpipe systems that are damaged or otherwise not working properly. Firefighters must take precautions to flush the standpipe before use to clear out debris and ensure that water is available.

See also

Fire Equipment Manufacturers' Association
Fire sprinkler

References

Essentials of Fire Fighting, Fourth Edition, copyright 1998 by the Board of Regents, Oklahoma State University

Firefighting equipment
Fire suppression
Piping